Yves Aristide Marius Giraud-Cabantous (8 October 1903 – 30 March 1973) was a racing driver from France.

Giraud-Cabantous was born in the 14th arrondissement of Paris. He drove a Talbot-Lago-Talbot in 10 Championship races in 1950 and 1951, and his final three events were in an HWM-Alta. He amassed a total of 5 Championship points, 3 at the 1950 British Grand Prix (also his highest finish, a 4th place) and 2 at the 1951 Belgian Grand Prix.  He died in Paris, aged 68, and is buried at Ivry Cemetery, Ivry-sur-Seine.

Formula One World Championship results
(key) (Races in bold indicate pole position; races in italics indicate fastest lap)

References

Sources
 Formula One World Championship results are derived from 

1904 births
1973 deaths
French racing drivers
French Formula One drivers
Talbot Formula One drivers
Hersham and Walton Motors Formula One drivers
24 Hours of Le Mans drivers
12 Hours of Reims drivers
World Sportscar Championship drivers
Burials at Ivry Cemetery
Grand Prix drivers